Arturo Cancela (1882–1957) was an Argentine novelist and critic. He coauthored several works with Pilar de Lusarreta.

Life
The focus of Cancela's literary work was humorous and satirical prose. His most successful launch was the collection of short stories "Three stories from Buenos Aires" (which are "El cocobacilo de Herrlin", "Una semana de holgorio" –based on the tragic week1– and "Elculto de los heroes"), in the that addresses the weaknesses of the occupation of Buenos Aires. Some publications also emerged in collaboration with Pilar de Lusarreta, who was his wife. He was the author of plays.

Bibliography
 Tres relatos porteños
 Film porteño (El diario de Nasute Pedernera)
 Historia funambulesca del profesor Landormy
 Palabras socráticas a los estudiantes
 Cristina o La gracia de Dios
 El amor a los sesenta
 Alondra
 El secreto de la herradura

References

1882 births
1957 deaths
Argentine male novelists
20th-century Argentine novelists